Amok may refer to:

 Running amok, the act of behaving disruptively or uncontrollably.

Film
Amok (1934 film), a French film
Amok (1944 film), a Mexican romantic drama
Amok (1983 film), a Moroccan drama
Amok (2022 short-film), a Hungarian-Romanian short-film animation

Literature
Amok (comics), an Italian comic book series
Amok (novella), by Stefan Zweig, 1922
Amok, a 1974 novel by Harry Thürk
Amok, a 2003 novel by Krystian Bala

Music
Amok (The Late B.P. Helium album), 2004
Amok (Sentenced album), 1995
Amok (Atoms for Peace album), 2013

Other uses
Steamed curry (Khmer: អាម៉ុក, amŏk), name in Cambodia for a curry steam-cooked in banana leaves
Fish amok, a Cambodian steamed fish curry
Amok (video game), a 1996 video game for the Sega Saturn
Mok language, also known as Amok
Amok (publisher), now Frémok, a Franco-Belgian comics publishing house
Amok Press, a defunct American book imprint

See also

"Amok Time", a 1967 episode of Star Trek: The Original Series
Amuck!, a 1972 Italian giallo film
AMOC (disambiguation)